Bishop Alexander Chira was a bishop of the Ruthenian Catholic Church. His immediate predecessor was Bishop Theodore G. Romzha. He is designated as a Confessor of the Faith.

Personal information
Chira was born January 17, 1897, in the village of Irhóc, Máramaros County (Vilhivci/Vilʹkhivtsi/Olkhovtsy).  His death was in exile on May 26, 1983 in the city of Karaganda, Kazakhstan.

Chira "was one of the many victims of the Soviet persecution of the Greek Catholic Church." While in a concentration camp in 1956, Chira clandestinely was appointed a bishop.

See also

 anti-Catholicism
 History of the Catholic Church
 Persecution of Christians
 Roman Catholicism in Romania
 Roman Catholicism in Ukraine

References

Victims of anti-Catholic violence
Catholicism-related controversies
20th-century Eastern Catholic bishops
Ruthenian Catholic bishops
1897 births
1983 deaths
People from Zakarpattia Oblast